Paul Farrow (born July 17, 1964) is a Wisconsin politician and businessman. The son of former Wisconsin Lieutenant Governor Margaret Farrow, he currently serves as the County Executive of Waukesha County, Wisconsin.

Born in Milwaukee, Wisconsin, Paul Farrow graduated from the Waukesha County Technical College and Carroll University. He was elected to the Wisconsin State Assembly in 2010. He was elected to the Wisconsin State Senate in December 2012 to fill the vacancy of Senator Rich Zipperer, who resigned to become Governor Scott Walker's Deputy Chief of Staff. He is the owner of a home inspection business.

On April 7, 2015, he was elected Waukesha County County Executive.

Biography

Personal life

Farrow currently lives in Pewaukee, Wisconsin with his wife Amy. 

His mother was former Lieutenant Governor Margaret Farrow.

Electoral History

2010

References

1964 births
21st-century American politicians
Businesspeople from Milwaukee
Carroll University alumni
County executives in Wisconsin
Living people
People from Pewaukee, Wisconsin
Politicians from Milwaukee
Republican Party members of the Wisconsin State Assembly
Republican Party Wisconsin state senators
Waukesha County Technical College alumni